Cooroibah is a locality in the Shire of Noosa, Queensland, Australia.

Geography
A section of the Great Sandy National Park has been established in the north of Cooroibah.  The Noosa River marks part of the northeast boundary and the whole of Lake Cooroibah is part of the suburb.  The southern boundary continues along part of Cooroibah Creek.  The largest flood event recorded at Lake Cooroibah was 2.55 metres in 1992.

History
The name is Aboriginal for "place of possums".

From 2008 to 2013, Cooroibah was within the Sunshine Coast Region due to the amalgamation and then de-amalgamation of the Shire of Noosa into the Sunshine Coast Region.

In , Cooroibah had a population of 1,744 people.

References

External links

 University of Queensland: Queensland Places:Cooroibah

Suburbs of Noosa Shire, Queensland
Localities in Queensland